Artists for Charity - Guitarists 4 the Kids is a compilation album which was produced and arranged by Slang Productions in 2006. Over 18 international artists contributed to the recording project to assist World Vision Canada and their philanthropic efforts.

At over 79 minutes in length, the Artists for Charity album featured a plethora of musical styles including hard rock, punk rock, progressive fusion, nouveau flamenco, blues, folk and experimental.

Track listing

References 

2006 compilation albums